Juho Oskari Lahdensuo (22 June 1864 – 3 July 1935; surname until 1906 Lagerstedt) was a Finnish farmer and politician. He was born in Lapua. He was a Member of the Diet of Finland from 1904 to 1905. Lahdensuo was a Member of the Parliament of Finland from 1910 to 1919, representing the Agrarian League.

References

1864 births
1935 deaths
People from Lapua
People from Vaasa Province (Grand Duchy of Finland)
Centre Party (Finland) politicians
Members of the Diet of Finland
Members of the Parliament of Finland (1910–11)
Members of the Parliament of Finland (1911–13)
Members of the Parliament of Finland (1913–16)
Members of the Parliament of Finland (1916–17)
Members of the Parliament of Finland (1917–19)
People of the Finnish Civil War (White side)